Alejandra Gutiérrez (born June 20, 1979) (also known as Alejandra Oraa) is a Venezuelan actress and model. Born to a Venezuelan mother and a Spanish father, she grew up in Caracas and moved to Miami in 1996 to study dance. Starting in 1998, she has appeared in various movies and TV-series, mainly in US-based Spanish TV-channels, such as Miami Hoy. She may be best known to international audiences for her role in Carlita's Secret with Eva Longoria and was also featured in Nip/Tuck. She is a previous playmate for Playboy Latin America, and has modelled for brands such as Visa Card, McDonald's and Bell South.

She works currently for CNN En Español's morning show "Cafe CNN". She serves as a studio host.

External links

Living people
1979 births
Actresses from Miami
Venezuelan television actresses
Actresses from Caracas
21st-century American women